Lion of Gujarat is a 2015 Bollywood action drama film directed by Dinesh Lamba and produced by Jitendra Gohil. This is a first Bollywood film shot entirely in Gujarat starring Dinesh Lamba, Homi Wadia and Akruti Agrawal in lead roles and Milan Vaidya, Manoj Parmar, Arman Tahil, Uday Danger, Yashpal, Gazal Rai, Bharat Thakkar in supporting role. The move was shot in the locations of Jamnagar, Porbandar and other parts of Gujarat. Lion of Gujarat is scheduled for release on 26 June 2015.

Cast
 Dinesh Lamba
 Homi Wadia
 Akruti Agrawal
 Milan Vaidya
 Manoj Parmar
 Arman Tahil
 Uday Danger
 Yashpal
 Gazal Rai
 Bharat Thakkar
 Dilavar Makrani

References

External links
 

2015 films
2010s Hindi-language films
Indian action drama films
2015 action drama films